Copachisa (Constructora de Parques de Chihuahua, S.A. de C.V.) is an industrial design and construction company based in the city of Chihuahua, Mexico, with regional offices in Monterrey, Ciudad Juárez, Querétaro, San Luis Potosí, and Mexico City.

References

Construction and civil engineering companies of Mexico
Construction and civil engineering companies established in 1958
Mexican companies established in 1958